The Black Shark is a heavyweight torpedo developed by WASS of Italy.

Development
Whitehead Alenia Sistemi Subacquei Italy developed the Black Shark torpedo as an evolution of the A184, with more advanced ECCM abilities and sonar. The advancements in electric motor design and battery allowed an increase in both range and speed.

Features 
The Black Shark torpedo offers fibre optic wire for increased bandwidth and signal processing ability compared to copper wire guided torpedo types. The sonar capability include non-doppler shifted target discrimination and multi-frequency capability that features advanced spatial and angular analysis abilities. The design goal for the torpedo was 300% improvement of passive acquisition and 200% active acquisition with its sonar system. The brushless motor design coupled with the aluminum-silver oxide (Al-AgO) battery gives the system a top speed , and a range of 50 km, performance envelope. Like all other battery powered HWTs, the battery power system does not suffer the loss of performance of Otto fuel II types at greater depths since there is no exhaust to deal with at greater pressures. The result is a 150% improvement in speed and 200% in torpedo endurance.

NSP/BSA - Nuovo Siluro Pesante / Black Shark Advanced 
Meanwhile, in Italy, WASS is developing NSP / BSA (Nuovo Siluro Pesante / Black Shark Advanced), new future torpedo for the Italian Navy as result of government program A/R SMD 1/2010 for development new BSA torpedoes for 87.5 million euros, within 2020:
 On 12 January 2014, first test launch new NSP / BSA (Nuovo Siluro Pesante / Black Shark Advanced) by SSK Scirè
 On 19 June 2014, second test launch new NSP / BSA (Nuovo Siluro Pesante / Black Shark Advanced) by SSK Scirè
BSA will arm Italian Todaro-class submarines, with about 80 torpedoes expected.

NSP/BSA - Nuovo Siluro Pesante / Black Shark Advanced will be on board new Italian Navy PPA vessels (Full version), with two launchers under the flight deck.
Warhead weight = 350/400 kg.

Users

 O'Higgins class (100 in 2003) 
 Thompson class

 Shiri class (16 in 2012 for 24.6 million euros) 

 Nagapasa class

 Todaro class - all batches (BSA - Black Shark Advanced -; planned about 80 torpedoes)

 Tunku Abdul Rahman class (30 in 2003 for 90 million euros) 

  (24 in 2005 for 47 million euros)

See also
 DM2A4 Sea Hake mod 4 - German torpedo using silver-zinc batteries
 F21 (torpedo) French torpedo
 Mark 48 torpedo - US torpedo
 Spearfish torpedo - British torpedo
 Yu-6 torpedo - Chinese torpedo
  - previous Italian heavy torpedo
 Roketsan Akya - Turkish heavy torpedo

References

External links 
 BLACK SHARK page on Leonardocompany.com

Torpedoes
Naval weapons of Italy
Naval weapons of Chile
Military equipment introduced in the 2000s